Monmouth Troy Goods Yard was a large goods yard near Monmouth Troy railway station in Monmouth, Wales. It was opened in 1857 by the Coleford, Monmouth, Usk and Pontypool Railway at the same time as the station. As other railways reached Monmouth Troy the goods yard grew in importance. At its height, the goods yard was used by the Wye Valley Railway, Coleford Railway, Ross and Monmouth Railway as well as the Coleford, Monmouth, Usk and Pontypool Railway. The goods yard closed in 1964 when the last two railways, the former Wye Valley Railway and Ross and Monmouth Railway, closed. The non-rail depot remained open until October 1964.

References

Disused railway stations in Monmouthshire
Wye Valley Railway
Transport in Monmouthshire
History of Monmouthshire
1857 establishments in Wales